Badd is a song.

Badd may also refer to:

 Badd Giacaman Museum
 Badd Company, a professional wrestling tag team in the American Wrestling Association
 Color Me Badd, an American contemporary R&B group
 Cover Me Badd, an EP by Butch Walker
 B.A.D.D. ("Bothered about Dungeons & Dragons"), Patricia Pulling's anti-satanism campaign that fought against role-playing games such as Dungeons & Dragons

See also 
 Bad (disambiguation)